Kauswagan, officially the Municipality of Kauswagan (Maranao: Monisipiyo san Kauswagan), is a 5th class municipality in the province of Lanao del Norte, Philippines. According to the 2020 census, it has a population of 24,193 people.

History

Kauswagan was organized into a municipality through President Manuel Roxas's  Executive Order No. 126, s. 1948 which separated the barrio of Kauswagan and the sitios of Linamon, Magoong, Purakan, Rebukon, Samburun, Lapayan, Takub and Kawit from the then municipality of Iligan.

Kauswagan was one of the municipalities that suffered in Lanao del Norte during the martial law and Ilaga war against the Moro.
In March 2000, then-President Joseph Estrada declared all-out-war against MILF when it was led by Abdullah Macapaar "Commander Bravo"  bin Sabbar fought the Philippine Army.

Settlement
Initially and before Spain Invasion and later American invasion, most people living in Kauswagan are Maranao Tribe. A folk story from the elders said that during Spain's occupation, some of the leaders from the interior areas of Lanao del Norte usually crossed the beaches of now the Municipality of Kolambogan to the beaches of now Ozamis City. By boat, they captured some of the people living on the other side of the sea and enslaved most of these captured people; these people were called Bisaya in Maranaw. 

There was also a story about the Mutia family in Zamboanga del Norte and Misamis Occidental, which initially came from the interior area of Lanao and is even now still retold by elders. Since the ancestors of the Mutia family in Zamboanga del Norte and Misamis Occidental lifted a small book hanging in the center of the house and said to the children the forbidden and do not even touch of even open the book. According to the claim, after many years, when somebody opened the book, they saw writing but an unfamiliar Language. Some say they look like Arabic letters, which could be the Jawi script.

In extended living and social process and sometimes in 1935 – 1944, under the National Land Settlement Administration (NLSA), During the Commonwealth Government, there was a House Representatives proposal to take land from the Island of Mindanao to use for settlement to help the Commonwealth Government, but in opposition of Congressman Datu Salipada Khalid Pendatun; The proposal was approved and signed by President Manuel L. Quezon. The settlers were composed of people who knew about Agriculture, Engineering, and Farming.

The settlers are composed of different people from the Islands of the Visayas and Island Luzon that have knowledge and experience of agriculture, technical, farming, lumber, carpenter, and other skills necessary for settlement. The first settlers settled in Areas:

In Lanao del Norte, the transport of settlers was peacefully successful due to the smooth negotiations with the Maranao Tribal Leaders and Land Lords. As a Welcome sign, the Landlords had donated a piece of their land (The piece of land being more than 5 hectares) to start the settlers' life as the beginning of living in the area. In the long run and process, the family of settler works to the landowners, and as a gift, since they are excellent workers, the landlord gave the small piece of their land. Some say that settlers traded and made the business to the landlord just a few item exchange of lands. Some landlords marry their workers' daughters, which results in the majority living in Lanao del Norte and Misamis Occidental having the blood of Maranao Tribe (Muslim Blood).

On the other hand, the settlement has been a problem, and conflict between non-Muslims and Muslims continues even until the implementation of martial law.

MILF Occupation of Kauswagan
During martial law and Ilaga group against Moro "Maranao Tribe" in Lanao del Norte. The Ilaga Group had ambushed the Passenger Jeep (Francisco Motors), where the most prominent older families in Barangay Delabayan, including the mother (Bae Iba) of Commander Tagoranao, were massacred. 

In the aftermath of being ambushed, the "Bae Iba" was still breathing and could still talk, and she said to some of the Ilaga group when they approached the Jeep, she would report to them what they did to his Son Commander Tagoranao. However, instead, the group leaves the four trigger men return to her and fire (1 magazine) in one direction to her, which results in the body of "Bae Iba" lying in blood.

There was a negotiation between the Mayor of Kauswagan and Commander Tagoranao not to put himself to Justice but instead to submit and surrender the four trigger men to MILF Lanao Del Norte. Shariah Law has confirmed death for the four suspects and commanded by Commander Tagoranao was executed. However, one of them did not execute instead of cutting the two legs and freed because he used his two legs to step forward to Jeep and as a message to the Ilaga group.

After the dropped of Sharia Law for the four trigger men, Commander Tagoranao had received the order from Late Aleem Aziz Mimbantas (MILF Lanao del Norte and Lanao del Sur Central Commander) to lead the (200) MILF selected soldiers.

And then, he was ordered to invade and massacre all the Ilaga group members living in Kauswagan, Lanao del Norte. During the Invasion, most civilians died in the sea because they did not know how to swim, and some died because of the sunk boat overloaded.

During the MILF invasion, the MILF controlled the key locations of Kauswagan and held the Municipal Hall in four hours in order to demand the Mayor for Justice of all Moro victims who had been killed. Places Held:

Geography

Barangays
Kauswagan is politically subdivided into 13 barangays.

*Six of the 13 Barangays of Kauswagan are populated by the Maranao Ethnicity in Baraason, Cayontor, Delabayan, Inudaran, Paiton and Tingin-Tingin.

Climate

Demographics

Language
The lingua franca/common language of this town is Bisaya, specifically the Cebuano language, while Tagalog is used in rare occasions. Cebuano and Maranao commonly used in households.

Economy

Kauswagan is known as the coconut industry of the interior areas. It also produce fishing, rice, corn and other vegetables.

Transportation

Transport Terminals

 Kauswagan Integrated Public Terminal (Both Bus and Jeepney)

Seaport
The former port of Kauswagan is located along the northern central coastal area facing the Iligan Bay, is now turned into a tourist spot.

Public transportation 
The public modes of transportation within the town are motorcycles, tricycles, and recently introduced modern tricycles or colloquially called in town as "baja" and "racal".

Government

Elected officials 
Members of the Kauswagan Municipal council (2019-2022):
 Municipal Mayor: Rommel C. Arnado 
 Vice Mayor: Evangeline H. Jubas
 SB Member: Matildo B Jubas, Jr
 SB Member: Alice Pala
 SB Member: Desiderio Ayuno
 SB Member: Rodulfo Dura
 SB Member: Aga Dimakuta
 SB Member: Mastura Manangolo
 SB Member: Alde Tan
 SB Member: Glorioso Flores
 ABC President: Cosain "Coco" Mananggolo
 SK Federated President: Marjune C. Carballo
 SB Secretary: Mr. Fortunato Densing

List of mayors
Mr. Jose Q. Balazo: April 25, 1948, to March 1950 (appointed first mayor of Kauswagan)
Mr. Santiago Ramirez: March 1950 to April 20, 1950 	
Capt. Joseph T. Sanguila Sr.: May 1950 to August 1951	 
Mr. Vicctoriano Rafols: September 1951 to December 31, 1951
Capt. Joseph T. Sanguila Sr.: January 1952 to 1955
Mr. Teodulfo D. Maslog Sr.: January 1956 to 1959 
Capt. Joseph T. Sanguila Sr.: January 1960 to 1963
Dr. Maximo P. Arnado Sr.: February 15, 1979, to April 15, 1986
Maj. Valentine E. Tarroza Sr.: May 1974 to February 12, 1979
Dr. Maximo P. Arnado Sr.: February 15, 1979 to April 15, 1986
Atty. Myron B. Rico: April 15, 1986, to December 1, 1987
Mr. Joseph M. Sanguila Jr.: December 2, 1987, to Jan 3, 1988
Mr. Pantaleon T. Hontiveros Sr. | January 4, 1988, to February 10, 1988	
Atty. Myron B. Rico: February 11, 1988, to June 1998
Hon. Mohammad Moamar Jack S. Maruhom: July 1, 1998, to May 11, 2007
Hon. Yasser Hadji Hasan Samporna: June 30, 2007, to June 30, 2010	
Hon. Rommel C. Arnado: (incumbent, since July 1, 2010)

*From government website

*Subject to change by June 30, 2022, after taking the oath of office.

Education

Elementary schools 
 Kauswagan Central Elementary School (public)
 Tacub Elementary School (public)
 Jose Balazo Memorial Elementary School (public)
 Libertad Elementary School (public)
 Kawit Occidental Elementary School (public)
 Tingin-Tingin Elementary School (public)
 Paiton Primary School (public)
 Baraason Integrated School (public)
 Cayontor Primary School (public)
 Upper Tugar Elementary School (public)
 Smartkidz Learning Playhouse Inc. (private, non-sect)

High schools 
 St. Vincent's Academy (private, sect.)
 Marcela T. Mabanta National High School (public)

Integrated schools (high school + elementary school) 

 Sultan Dimasangcay Mananggolo Integrated School (Delabayan Elementary School) (public)
 Kawit Oriental Integrated School of Fisheries (public)

References

External links
 Kauswagan Profile at the DTI Cities and Municipalities Competitive Index
 [ Philippine Standard Geographic Code]
Philippine Census Information
Local Governance Performance Management System

Municipalities of Lanao del Norte
Establishments by Philippine executive order